Frederick H. Dunlap (born April 18, 1928) is a former American football coach and college athletics administrator.  He served as the head football coach at Lehigh University from 1965 to 1975 and at Colgate University from 1976 to 1987, compiling career college football record of 126–111–5.  Dunlap was the athletic director at Colgate form 1976 to 1992.

Coaching career

Lehigh
Dunlap was the 23rd head football coach at Lehigh University and he held that position for 11 seasons, from 1965 until 1975.  His coaching record at Lehigh was 49–62–2.

Colgate
Dunlap was the 29th head football coach at Colgate University.  He held that position for 12 seasons, from 1976 until 1987.  His coaching record at Colgate was 77–49–3.

Head coaching record

References

1928 births
Living people
Colgate Raiders athletic directors
Colgate Raiders football coaches
Cornell Big Red football coaches
Lehigh Mountain Hawks football coaches